German submarine U-584 was a Type VIIC U-boat built for Nazi Germany's Kriegsmarine for service during World War II.
She was laid down on 1 October 1940 by Blohm & Voss, Hamburg as yard number 560, launched on 26 June 1941 and commissioned on 21 August 1941 under Kapitänleunant Joachim Deecke.

Design
German Type VIIC submarines were preceded by the shorter Type VIIB submarines. U-584 had a displacement of  when at the surface and  while submerged. She had two shafts and two  propellers.

U-584 was fitted with five  torpedo tubes (four fitted at the bow and one at the stern), fourteen torpedoes, one  SK C/35 naval gun, 220 rounds, and a  C/30 anti-aircraft gun. The boat had a complement of between forty-four and sixty.

Service history
The boat's career began with training at 5th U-boat Flotilla on 21 August 1941, followed by active service on 1 December 1941 as part of the 1st Flotilla for the remainder of her service.

US Saboteur Landing
On 25 May 1942, the boat departed Brest, France for a special mission as part of Operation Pastorius. On 18 June, she landed a 4-man saboteur team just south of Jacksonville, Florida. This was one of two teams landed within a week of each other on the US east coast; the other team came aboard . The boat then returned safely to Brest on 22 July.

Wolfpacks
U-584 took part in 16 wolfpacks, namely:
 Ulan (25 December 1941 – 10 January 1942) 
 Stier (29 August – 2 September 1942)
 Vorwärts (2 – 26 September 1942)
 Luchs (27 – 29 September 1942)
 Letzte Ritter (29 September – 1 October 1942)
 Falke (4 – 19 January 1943)
 Landsknecht (19 – 28 January 1943)
 Hartherz (3 – 7 February 1943)
 Löwenherz (1 – 10 April 1943)
 Lerche (10 – 15 April 1943)
 Specht (21 April – 4 May 1943)
 Fink (4 – 6 May 1943)
 Elbe (7 – 10 May 1943)
 Elbe 1 (10 – 14 May 1943)
 Leuthen (15 – 24 September 1943)
 Rossbach (24 September – 6 October 1943)

Fate
U-584 was sunk on 31 October 1943 in the North Atlantic in position , by depth charges from US Avenger aircraft operating from escort carrier . All hands were lost.

Summary of raiding history

References

Notes

Citations

Bibliography

External links

German Type VIIC submarines
1941 ships
U-boats commissioned in 1941
Ships lost with all hands
U-boats sunk in 1943
U-boats sunk by US aircraft
World War II shipwrecks in the Atlantic Ocean
World War II submarines of Germany
Ships built in Hamburg
Maritime incidents in October 1943